Lukáš Gašparovič (born 17 February 1993 in Bratislava, Slovakia) is a Slovak football midfielder who currently plays for the MFK Dukla Banská Bystrica. 

Gašparovič had been made popular in 2019, when his likeness to Luka Modrić had been discovered and publicised.

Career
He made his professional debut for Slovan Bratislava against Spartak Myjava on 26 October 2013, entering in as a substitute in place of Erik Grendel.

External links
Slovan Bratislava profile

References

 

1993 births
Living people
Slovak footballers
Association football midfielders
FK Inter Bratislava players
ŠK Slovan Bratislava players
FK Iskra Borčice players
ŠK Svätý Jur players
FC Petržalka players
MFK Dukla Banská Bystrica players
Slovak Super Liga players
Footballers from Bratislava